Conon was a Byzantine military leader during the reign of Justinian I. During the Siege of Rome he was sent to lead reinforcements to Belisarius. Landing in Naples he and Paulus, another Byzantine military commander, led 3,000 Isaurians to Belisarius’ aid. First they waited for other contingents' reinforcements to gather in Naples before moving on to Rome. Later he was the leader of the garrison at Ancona. When an army under Vacimus arrived at Ancona he deployed to face them in open battle but quickly retreated when seeing the full size of the enemy force. The gates were already closed but the garrison could climb into the city using ropes. The attackers had siege equipment ready and could immediately attempt to storm the city. The attackers gained a foothold on the walls but Ultimuth, from Belisarius’ guards, and Gouboulgoudou, from Valerian's guard, drove the attackers out both suffering severe wounds. Later Conon led the 1,000 strong garrison of Naples during the Siege of Naples.

References

6th-century Byzantine military personnel
Generals of Justinian I